The 1966–67 New York Knicks season was the 21st season for the team in the National Basketball Association (NBA). In the regular season, the Knicks finished in fourth place in the Eastern Division with a 36–45 record, earning their first playoff berth in eight years. New York lost in the opening round of the playoffs to the Boston Celtics, three games to one.

NBA Draft

Note: This is not an extensive list; it only covers the first and second rounds, and any other players picked by the franchise that played at least one game in the league.

Roster

Regular season

Season standings

x – clinched playoff spot

Record vs. opponents

Game log

Playoffs

|- align="center" bgcolor="#ffcccc"
| 1
| March 21
| @ Boston
| L 110–140
| Willis Reed (23)
| Walt Bellamy (10)
| Dick Van Arsdale (8)
| Boston Garden8,632
| 0–1
|- align="center" bgcolor="#ffcccc"
| 2
| March 25
| Boston
| L 108–115
| Willis Reed (30)
| Willis Reed (21)
| Howard Komives (6)
| Madison Square Garden III10,009
| 0–2
|- align="center" bgcolor="#ccffcc"
| 3
| March 26
| @ Boston
| W 123–112
| Willis Reed (38)
| Bellamy, Reed (16)
| Howard Komives (5)
| Boston Garden10,738
| 1–2
|- align="center" bgcolor="#ffcccc"
| 4
| March 28
| Boston
| L 109–118
| Freddie Crawford (26)
| Walt Bellamy (20)
| Freddie Crawford (6)
| Madison Square Garden III17,173
| 1–3
|-

Awards and records
Willis Reed, All-NBA Second Team
Cazzie Russell, NBA All-Rookie Team 1st Team

References

New York Knicks seasons
New York
New York Knicks
New York Knicks
1960s in Manhattan
Madison Square Garden